This article contains information about the literary events and publications of 1758.

Events
April 15 – Samuel Johnson begins publishing a series of essays, The Idler (1758–1760), in the Universal Chronicle.
April 24 – Robert Dodsley and his brother James sign a contract with Edmund Burke to launch The Annual Register.
April 27 – The French historian Jean-François Marmontel enters the service of Madame de Pompadour.
July/August – The poet and children's writer Anna Laetitia Barbauld and her family move to Warrington in north-west England.
October – Voltaire buys an estate at Ferney in eastern France.
unknown date – The French mathematician and philosopher Pierre Louis Maupertuis moves to his final home in Basel, Switzerland.

New books

Prose
John Armstrong as Launcelot Temple – Sketches, or, Essays on Various Subjects
Charlotte Lennox – Henrietta
Thomas Marryat – Therapeutics, or a New Practice of Physic (in Latin)
Madame Riccoboni – Histoire du marquis de Cressy
Horace Walpole
A Dialogue Between Two Great Ladies
Fugitive Pieces

Drama
John Cleland – Tombo-Chiqui, or, The American Savage (not produced)
Denis Diderot – Le Père de famille
Robert Dodsley – Cleone
David Garrick – Florizel and Perdita
John Home – Aegis
Charlotte Lennox – Philander
Arthur Murphy – The Upholsterer
George Alexander Stevens – Albion Restored

Poetry

Mark Akenside – An Ode to the Country Gentlemen
Anica Bošković – Dijalog
John Gilbert Cooper – The Call of Aristippus
Johann Wilhelm Ludwig Gleim – Preussische Kriegslieder von einem Grenadier (Prussian War Songs of a Grenadier)
Eugenio Gerardo Lobo – Obras poéticas
James Macpherson – The Highlander
Heyat Mahmud – Āmbiyābāṇī; Bengali
Thomas Parnell – Posthumous Works

Non-fiction
William Blackstone – A Discourse on the Study of Law
John Brown – An Explanatory Defence of the Estimate of the Manners and Principles of the Times (see 1757)
Andrés Marcos Burriel – Paleografía española
Elizabeth Carter (translator) – All the Works of Epictetus Which Are Now Extant
José Francisco de Isla – Historia del famoso predicador Fray Gerundio de Campazas, alias Zotes
Benjamin Franklin – Father Abraham's Sermon
Oliver Goldsmith as "James Willington" – The Memoirs of a Protestant
William Hawkins – Tracts in Divinity
Claude Adrien Helvétius – De l'Esprit
Henry Home – Historical Law-Tracts
Robert Lowth – The Life of William of Wykeham
Thomas Marryat – Therapeutics, or a New Practice of Physic
Antoine-Joseph Pernety
Dictionnaire mytho-hermétique, dans lequel on trouve les allégories fabuleuses des poètes, les métaphores, les énigmes et les termes barbares des philosophes hermétiques expliqués
Les Fables égyptiennes et grecques dévoilées et réduites au même principe, avec une explication des hiéroglyphes et de la guerre de Troye
Antoine Simon Le Page Du Pratz – Histoire de la Louisiane (History of Louisiana)
Richard Price – A Review of the Principal Questions and Difficulties in Morals
Emanuel Swedenborg
Earths in the Universe
Heaven and Hell
New Jerusalem and its Heavenly Doctrine
The Last Judgement
Jonathan Swift – The History of the Last Four Years of the Queen
Horace Walpole – A Catalogue of the Royal and Noble Authors of England
Arthur Young – The Theatre of the Present War in North America

Births
January 12 – Dmitry Gorchakov, Russian writer, dramatist and poet (died 1824)
February 3
Vasily Kapnist, Ukrainian poet and playwright (died 1823)
Valentin Vodnik, Carniolan Slovene poet, writer and priest (died 1819)
February 10 – Amalia Holst, German writer, intellectual, and feminist (died 1829)
March 15 – Magdalene Sophie Buchholm, Norwegian poet (died 1826)
April 30 – Jane West (Prudentia Homespun), English novelist and writer of conduct books (died 1852)
October 16 – Noah Webster, American lexicographer (died 1843)
December 9 – Richard Colt Hoare, English antiquary, archeologist and traveler (died 1838)

Deaths
January 7 – Allan Ramsay the Elder, Scottish poet (born 1686)
March 22 – Jonathan Edwards, American theologian and preacher (born 1703)
October – Theophilus Cibber, English dramatist and actor (born 1703; lost at sea)

October 27 bur. – Elizabeth Blackwell, Scottish botanic writer and illustrator (born 1707)
December 25 – James Hervey, English religious writer and cleric (born 1714)

References

 
Years of the 18th century in literature